is a passenger railway station located in the city of Katō,  Hyōgo Prefecture, Japan, operated by West Japan Railway Company (JR West).

Lines
Taki Station is served by the Kakogawa Line and is 28.4 kilometers kilometers from the terminus of the line at

Station layout
The station consists of one ground-level side platform serving a single bi-directional track. The station is unattended.

History
It reopened 1 May 1914 and was further reduced in status to that of a seasonal provisional stop on 9 May 1921. It became a full passenger station on 1 June 1943. With the privatization of the Japan National Railways (JNR) on 1 April 1987, the station came under the aegis of the West Japan Railway Company.

Passenger statistics
In fiscal 2019, the station was used by an average of 54 passengers daily

Surrounding area
 Toryudana Rapids

See also
List of railway stations in Japan

References

External links

  

Railway stations in Hyōgo Prefecture
Railway stations in Japan opened in 1913
Katō, Hyōgo